Andersen v. King County, 138 P.3d 963 (Wash. 2006), formerly Andersen v. Sims, is a Washington Supreme Court case in which eight lesbian and gay couples sued King County and the state of Washington for denying them marriage licenses under the state's 1998 Defense of Marriage Act (DOMA), which defined marriage as between a man and a woman. The court ruled that banning same-sex marriage is constitutional since the legislature could reasonably believe it furthers the government interest in promoting procreation.

The state enacted same-sex marriage in 2012. Opponents forced a referendum on the issue, and voters approved the legislation on November 6.

Lower court decisions
In the case, King County Superior Court Judge William L. Downing ruled that the state law prohibiting same-sex marriages, or DOMA, was unconstitutional, finding for the plaintiffs on August 4, 2004. The judge ruled that restricting the institution of marriage to opposite sex couples "is not rationally related to any legitimate or compelling state interest." The ruling was appealed to the state Supreme Court.

Appeal
In 2005, the Andersen v. Sims case was consolidated with Castle v. State, another case that was appealed to the Washington Supreme Court from a lower court in Thurston County. The combined cases were filed under Andersen v. King County and Washington Supreme Court heard oral argument on March 8, 2005. On July 26, 2006, the court's ruled in a 5–4 decision that the state Defense of Marriage Act was constitutional. The majority ruled that the state DOMA does not violate the state's constitution.

Decision
In the plurality opinion signed by Justices Gerry L. Alexander and Charles W. Johnson, Justice Barbara Madsen wrote that "Under this standard, DOMA is constitutional because the legislature was entitled to believe that limiting marriage to opposite-sex couples furthers procreation, essential to the survival of the human race, and furthers the well-being of children by encouraging families where children are reared in homes headed by the children's biological parents." Justice Gerry L. Alexander issued a separate concurring opinion, emphasizing the possibility that the legislature or people could expand the definition of marriage in the state. Justice James M. Johnson also issued a separate opinion, co-signed by Justice Richard B. Sanders, which concurred in the judgment only and suggested that the lower court rulings that held DOMA unconstitutional were result-oriented and disregarded the law. The reasoning in Madsen's plurality opinion is similar to that of  New York's highest court in Hernandez v. Robles, which was decided on July 6, 2006.

The four justices that dissented accused the majority of relying upon "circular reasoning" in formulating their opinion. In the principal dissenting opinion, signed by Justices Tom Chambers, Susan Owens, and Bobbe J. Bridge, Justice Mary Fairhurst asked: "Would giving same-sex couples the same right that opposite-sex couples enjoy injure the state's interest in procreation and healthy child rearing?" Justice Tom Chambers issued a separate dissenting opinion signed by Justice Susan Owens, while Justice Bobbe J. Bridge issued another dissenting opinion.

Aftermath
Same-sex marriage supporters disagreed with the procreation argument and proposed Initiative 957 to challenge the court's assertion. It would have required that all marriages recognized by the state to produce offspring within three years of their solemnization. The initiative was created by the Washington Defense of Marriage Alliance, an LGBT rights group. The Washington Defense of Marriage Alliance hoped to use this to create a test case in order to have a court strike down the measure and highlight what they perceived as the weakness of the Andersen decision's logic. The initiative was filed on January 10, 2007, and withdrawn on July 3, 2007, after sponsors collected about 40,000 signatures, which was too few to qualify the measure for the November ballot.

A bill to legalize same-sex marriage passed the legislature and was signed by Governor Christine Gregoire on February 13, 2012, but opponents gathered enough signatures to force a voter referendum on the legislation. Voters approved the proposed legislation in November 2012, making same-sex marriage legal as of December 6 of that year.

See also
Domestic partnership in Washington (state)
Same-sex marriage in Washington (state)
LGBT rights in Washington (state)

References

External links
Text of the 2004 King County ruling (PDF)
Text of the 2006 Washington Supreme Court lead ruling (PDF)
Links to PDF articles on all 6 Washington Supreme Court opinions issued in Andersen v. King County.

Washington (state) state case law
2006 in United States case law
LGBT in Washington (state)
2006 in Washington (state)
United States same-sex union case law
History of King County, Washington
2006 in LGBT history